Peter Moore (born 18 July 1962) is an Australian travel writer.

Moore, who was born in Sydney, claims to have visited 105 countries. He currently lives with his wife and daughter in London. He has published many books that re-tell tales of his travels.

He is a Vespa enthusiast and his 2005 book Vroom with a View and 2007 book Vroom by the Sea feature trips through Italy taken on vintage Italian motorscooters.

Bibliography
No Shitting in the Toilet – The travel guide for when you've really lost it (1997)
The Wrong Way Home – London to Sydney the hard way (1999)
The Full Montezuma – Around Central America with the girl next door (2001)
Swahili for the Broken-Hearted – Cape Town to Cairo by any means possible (2003)
Vroom with a View – In search of Italy's Dolce Vita on a '61 Vespa (2005)
Same Same, but Different (2006, eBook)
Crikey! (unpublished)
Vroom by the Sea – The sunny parts of Italy on a bright orange Vespa (Australia 2007, UK 2009)

References

External links
 Official site

1962 births
Australian travel writers
Living people
Writers from Sydney